Restivo is a surname. Notable people with the surname include: 

 Carl Restivo, American musician
 Danilo Restivo (born 1972), Italian convicted of murders in Italy and the UK
 Franco Restivo (1911–1976), Italian politician
 Johnny Restivo (born 1943), American rock and roll vocalist
 Matteo Restivo (born 1994), Italian swimmer 
 Sal Restivo (born 1940), American sociologist of science
 Tommy Restivo, American football player and coach